Dworcowy  is a village in the administrative district of Gmina Niegosławice, within Żagań County, Lubusz Voivodeship, in western Poland.

The village has a famous bridge, originally wooden, which was built between 1,853 - 1,854 (opening November 1, 1854) near the newly formed main railway station.

References

Dworcowy